Ruffneck Peak is in the Salmon River Range in the U.S. state of Idaho. The peak is located in Salmon-Challis National Forests. A historic fire lookout is on top of Ruffneck Peak. Constructed in 1932, the fire lookout is staffed seasonally.

References

Mountains of Custer County, Idaho
Mountains of Idaho